Rice–Dodge–Burgess Farm, also known as the Stone House at Chepachet Pond, is a historic home and farm complex located at Cedarville in Herkimer County, New York. The farm was established in the 1820s, and includes a gable-roofed stone house (1830); timber-framed barn (early-mid 19th century); stone smokehouse (early-mid 19th century); small family cemetery (late 19th or early 20th century); stone dam, mill pond, and mill ruins (between 1815 and 1830); and farm fields. The stone house is a 1 ½ story, rectangular-plan limestone dwelling with a wood-framed screen porch (c. 1925).

It was listed on the National Register of Historic Places in 2015.

References

Farms on the National Register of Historic Places in New York (state)
Houses completed in 1830
Buildings and structures in Herkimer County, New York
National Register of Historic Places in Herkimer County, New York